Rinaldo Francisco de Lima (born January 19, 1973 in Recife), or simply Nem, is a former Brazilian football player, specialising as a central defender.

Career
Nem started his career at São Paulo playing alongside Rogerio Ceni, Edmilson, and Cafu in 1994, he played for the club until the 1999 season after a fallout with then President Juvenal Juvêncio. He then left for Paraná but after dispute over his hage wages he soon left only after a season.

He then joined Atlético-PR but then left for Atlético Mineiro. Here is where he would relive his São Paulo days, playing alongside one of the team's best line ups where he and Cicinho and Álvaro created one of the League's strongest defenses.

After several good showings he then left for SC Braga where he was influential in the back and enjoyed 5 years in Portugal before returning to Brazil in June 2007 for Paraná.

Honours
São Paulo State League: 1998, 2000
Brazilian League (2nd division): 2000
Brazilian League: 2001
Paraná State League: 2001

Contract
12 June 2007 to 31 December 2007

External links

CBF

1973 births
Living people
Sportspeople from Recife
Brazilian footballers
Association football defenders
Brazilian football managers
São Paulo FC players
Paraná Clube players
Club Athletico Paranaense players
Clube Atlético Mineiro players
Esporte Clube XV de Novembro (Jaú) managers